The Aeroprakt A-20 Vista is a family of Ukrainian tandem two-seat high-wing, strut-braced, pusher configuration conventional landing gear, ultralight aircraft, produced by Aeroprakt. The A-20 was introduced into the North American market at AirVenture 1999.

Design and development

Design of the A-20 began in 1990, with the first prototype making its maiden flight on 5 August 1991, with the first production aircraft flying on 15 August 1993. The A-20 is constructed with a fiberglass forward fuselage and cockpit with aluminium wings and tail surfaces covered in doped aircraft fabric. The wing is fitted with half-span ailerons and flaps. Flaperons are available on some models. The conventional landing gear has steel sprung main gear legs.

The A-20 was originally designed for the  Rotax 503 two-stroke aircraft engine. The low drag airframe produces acceptable performance on this low power output. Optional engines include the  Rotax 582 and  Rotax 912ULS

Operational history
An A-20 won the European Microlight Championship in 2002.

Variants
A-20 Vista
Initial version with a  Rotax 503 engine.
A-20 Vista STOL
STOL version with a  Rotax 582 engine and standard slotted flaperons.
A-20 Vista SS
Higher cruise speed version with a reduced span  wing and a  Rotax 582 engine.
A-20 Cruiser
Higher cruise speed version with a reduced span  wing and a  Rotax 912ULS engine.
A-20 Cruiser-S
Higher cruise speed version with a reduced span  wing, a  Rotax 912ULS engine and standard slotted flaperons.
A-26 Vulcan
A highly modified twin engine pusher.
A-30 Vista SpeedsterA high performance derivative of the A-20.

Specifications (A-20)

References
Notes

Bibliography
Jackson, Paul. Jane's All The World's Aircraft 2003–2004. Coulsdon, UK:Jane's Information Group, 2003. .

External links

1990s Ukrainian ultralight aircraft
Vista
Single-engined pusher aircraft
High-wing aircraft